The Alcatel One Touch Fire is one of the first generation of smartphones preinstalled with Firefox OS, an open-source mobile operating system developed by Mozilla.

The phone was developed and marketed by Alcatel Mobile Phones as a lower-cost, entry-level smartphone for specific Latin American and European countries: Brazil, Chile, Colombia, Mexico, Peru, Uruguay, and Venezuela in Latin America; and Germany, Greece, Hungary, Italy, Montenegro, Poland, and Serbia in Europe. Mobile network operators who have carried the phone include Congstar (Germany), Cosmote (Greece), Movistar (Chile, Mexico, Peru, Uruguay, Venezuela), T-Mobile (Hungary, Montenegro, Macedonia), Telcel (Mexico), Telenor (Serbia and Montenegro), Telecom Italia Mobile (Italy), and Vivo (Brazil).

The One Touch Fire is a variation of an earlier, Android-based smartphone, the Alcatel One Touch T'Pop. Unlike the One Touch Fire, the One Touch T'Pop uses an ARM Cortex-A9 CPU and a PowerVR SGX531 GPU; it also incorporates "home" and "back" push-buttons, distinct cosmetics, and other differences. The One Touch Fire is sold in three color schemes: Mozilla Orange, Apple Green, and Pure White.

There are two model numbers for the One Touch Fire: 4012A and 4012X, which support different cellular network standards and frequency bands for different countries. The 4012A has a quadband GSM radio that can communicate at 850, 900, 1800, or 1900 MHz; and a UMTS radio capable of 850, 1900, and 2100 MHz communication. The 4012X has only a UMTS radio that communicates at 900 or 2100 MHz. Consequently, the 4012X has a lower specific absorption rate.

The 4012A and 4012X are succeeded by the One Touch Fire C, One Touch Fire E, and One Touch Fire S.

As of 2022, the Alcatel One Touch Fire still has very little resale value worldwide, due to discontinuation of Firefox OS of which was not fared very well and hardly can be considered a collector item.

See also
Comparison of Firefox OS devices

References

Firefox OS devices
Linux-based devices
Mobile Linux
Open-source mobile phones
Smartphones
Alcatel mobile phones
Mobile phones introduced in 2013